Quangang (Min Nan: Chôan-káng) is a district of Quanzhou, Fujian province, People's Republic of China. Before 1996 it was part of Hui'an County. In 2000, it separated itself from Hui'an, and was renamed Quangang. The population is 360,000.  The majority is Han, with some minority population, e.g. Hui and Mongol. The post code is 362114.

The district government locates in Shanyao street.

Establishment

Administration
The district is divided into seven town governments:

 Nanpu
 Qianhuang
 Fengwei
 Houlong
 Jieshan
 Shanyao
 Tuling

See also
Fujian Quangang Carbon Nine leakage event

Notes and references

County-level divisions of Fujian